

Current installations
Camp Williams - National Guard training site operated by the Utah National Guard.
Dugway Proving Ground - Allied biological and chemical weapon defense systems testing.
Michael Army Airfield - Airport at Dugway Proving Ground.
Hill Air Force Base - A major U.S. Air Force Base.
Ogden Air Logistics Complex - Provides support and maintenance for weapon systems at Hill Air Force Base.
Roland R. Wright Air National Guard Base - Utah Air National Guard base located on the east side of the Salt Lake City International Airport.
Tooele Army Depot - A U.S. Army war reserve and training ammunition storage facility.
Utah Test and Training Range - Military testing and training area.
Utah National Guard Army Aviation Support Facility (AASF) - A U.S. Army helicopter refueling and training facility at South Valley Regional Airport.

Former installations
Black Mesa Test Range - Former rocket testing facility.
Camp Floyd/Fort Crittenden
Deseret Chemical Depot - A U.S. Army chemical weapons storage facility. Site transferred to Tooele Army Depot in 2013. 
Tooele Chemical Agent Disposal Facility - Weapon disposal facility at Deseret Chemical Depot.
Clearfield Naval Supply Depot
Fort Cameron
Fort Douglas - A small portion of the fort is still used as the Stephen A. Douglas Armed Forces Reserve Center.
Fort Duchesne
Fort Thornburgh - Housed the soldiers preventing the Ute people from leaving the nearby Uintah Valley and Uncompahgre/Ouray Reservations.
Gilson Butte - Former rocket testing facility.
Granite Peak Installation - Former biological weapons testing facility.
Green River Launch Complex
Hurricane Supersonic Research Site
Kearns Army Air base
Ogden Defense Depot
Ogden Arsenal - Reserve depot built 1920, combined with Hill Air Force base in 1955.
Wendover Air Force Base

See also
Utah World War II Army Airfields
Utah National Guard
Utah Army National Guard
Utah Air National Guard
Utah State Defense Force

References

 
Military
Utah
.
M